Cliburn may refer to:

 Cliburn, Cumbria, England
 Cliburn railway station
Cliburn (surname)
 Van Cliburn (1934–2013), American pianist
 Van Cliburn International Piano Competition
 Van Cliburn Foundation